Jérémy Acédo (born 2 September 1987 in Paray-le-Monial, Saône-et-Loire) is a  French footballer. He currently plays for Genêts Anglet.

References

External links

1987 births
Living people
People from Paray-le-Monial
French footballers
Association football midfielders
FC Gueugnon players
FC Martigues players
Genêts Anglet players
PFC Litex Lovech players
AS Moulins players
Ligue 2 players
French-Basque people
French expatriate sportspeople in Bulgaria
First Professional Football League (Bulgaria) players
Expatriate footballers in Bulgaria
Stade Montois (football) players
Sportspeople from Saône-et-Loire
Footballers from Bourgogne-Franche-Comté
French expatriate footballers